Aylesworth is an unincorporated community in Shawnee Township, Fountain County, in the U.S. state of Indiana.

History
A post office was established at Aylesworth in 1884, and remained in operation until it was discontinued in 1907.

Geography

References

Unincorporated communities in Fountain County, Indiana
Unincorporated communities in Indiana